Aleksandrs Jerofejevs (sometimes referred to as Alexander Erofeev; born 12 April 1984) is a Latvian ice hockey defenceman, currently playing for Dinamo Riga of Kontinental Hockey League (KHL).

Before playing European Elite hockey, Erofeev played 2004–05 in the USHL with the Sioux Falls Stampede and 2005–06 in the UHL with the Roanoke Valley Vipers. He is currently playing for Latvia in the 2015 IIHF World Championship.

External links

1984 births
Latvian expatriate ice hockey people
Metallurg Novokuznetsk players
Living people
Ice hockey people from Riga
Latvian ice hockey defencemen
HC Neftekhimik Nizhnekamsk players
HC Sparta Praha players
HK Liepājas Metalurgs players
Ilves players
Dinamo Riga players
Sioux Falls Stampede players
Roanoke Valley Vipers players
HK Poprad players
HC Slovan Bratislava players
Latvian expatriate sportspeople in Russia
Latvian expatriate sportspeople in the United States
Latvian expatriate sportspeople in the Czech Republic
Latvian expatriate sportspeople in Finland
Latvian expatriate sportspeople in Slovakia
Latvian expatriate sportspeople in Italy
Latvian expatriate sportspeople in Poland
Expatriate ice hockey players in Russia
Expatriate ice hockey players in the United States
Expatriate ice hockey players in the Czech Republic
Expatriate ice hockey players in Finland
Expatriate ice hockey players in Slovakia
Expatriate ice hockey players in Italy
Expatriate ice hockey players in Poland